The Battle of Vimory, occurred on 26 October 1587 between the French royal (Catholic) forces of King Henry III of France commanded by Henry of Guise and German and Swiss mercenaries commanded by Fabien I, Burgrave of Dohna and William-Robert de la Marck, Duke of Bouillon who were hired to assist Henry of Navarre's Huguenot forces during the eighth and final war (1585-1598) of the French Wars of Religion.

The Protestant mercenaries were funded by Elizabeth I of England and the King of Denmark.  After having pillaged the Lorraine region, they arrived in Burgundy and entered into the Beauce region. However, conflicts divided the two commanders and their German and Swiss troops.

The Swiss troops were surprised by Henry of Guise's army, and were routed.  The reiters retreated to the castle of Auneau and the Swiss decided to negotiate with the royal troops.

Notes and references
This article is based on a translation of the article Bataille de Vimory from the French Wikipedia on 15 March 2007.
 Jouanna, Arlette and Jacqueline Boucher, Dominique Biloghi, Guy Thiec.  Histoire et dictionnaire des Guerres de religion.  Collection: Bouquins.  Paris: Laffont, 1998. 

Battles involving France
Battles of the French Wars of Religion
1587 in France
Conflicts in 1587
Vimory
History of Loiret